Gordon Harold "Gertie" Sawley (28 June 1913 – 14 August 1942) was an Australian rules footballer who played with South Melbourne in the Victorian Football League (VFL).

Family
The son of Andrew Gilbert Sawley (1883-1964), and Florence Maud Sawley (1883-1964), née Baldock, Gordon Harold Sawley was born at Norwood, South Australia on 28 June 1913.

Siblings
His older brother, Frank Sawley, played 26 games with Norwood (1931-1934).

Frank's son, Brian Sawley, played 138 games with Norwood. Brian Sawley is also remembered for being knocked unconscious by Victorian ruckman John Peck in the third quarter of the interstate match between Victoria and South Australia in Adelaide om 7 July 1963. Peck was found guilty of the offence by the South Australian Tribunal, which left the penalty to be determined by the VFL — displaying controversial leniency, the VFL only suspended Peck for two weeks.

His younger brother, Albert Sawley, played 110 games for Norwood and 11 games for St Kilda.

Football

Norwood
He played 53 games for Norwood (1937-1941).

South Melbourne
He joined the VFL side South Melbourne while on RAAF duties, and played in 7 games in the 1941 season.

Death
He was killed during the Second World War in a training accident whilst serving in the Royal Air Force. On 14 August 1942, Sawley, piloting an Armstrong Whitworth Whitley, took off from RAF Kinloss on a nighttime cross-country training exercise that would be followed by a bombing practice exercise. After the cross-country  exercise operation finished, the Whitley headed back to RAF Kinloss and informed the base by radio that they would proceed on the bombing exercise.

The aircraft was seen over Forres, and proceeded to turn north and then east. Soon after, Sawley's plane crashed into the North Sea off Findhorn, Scotland, killing the flying officer and the 4 other crew on board. Search parties were dispatched, but only found wreckage. None of the crew's bodies have been found.

He has no known grave, and is commemorated at the Air Forces Memorial at Runnymede.

See also
 List of Victorian Football League players who died in active service

Footnotes

References
 Holmesby, Russell & Main, Jim (2007). The Encyclopedia of AFL Footballers. 7th ed. Melbourne: Bas Publishing.
 World War Two Nominal Roll: Flying Officer Gordon Harold Sawley (407951), Department of Veterans' Affairs.
 Roll of Honour: Flying Officer Gordon Harold Sawley (407951), Australian War Memorial.
 Roll of Honour Circular: Flying Officer Gordon Harold Sawley (407951), Australian War Memorial.
 Casualty Lists: South Australian Names: RAAF List: Believed Killed, Aircraft Accident, The (Adelaide) Chronicle, (Thursday, 3 September 1942), p.24.
 Casualty Lists: South Australian Names: RAAF List: Presumed Dead, The (Adelaide) Chronicle, (Thursday, 17 December 1942), p.19.
 Flying Officer Gordon Harold Sawley (407951), Commonwealth War Graves Commission.

External links
 
 

1913 births
1942 deaths
Australian rules footballers from South Australia
Sydney Swans players
Norwood Football Club players
Royal Australian Air Force personnel of World War II
Australian military personnel killed in World War II
Aviators killed in aviation accidents or incidents in Scotland
Royal Australian Air Force officers
Victims of aviation accidents or incidents in 1942